The Dutch Republic Lion (also known as States Lion) was the badge of the Union of Utrecht, the Republic of the Seven United Netherlands, and a precursor of the current coat of arms of the Kingdom the Netherlands.

Background

There are three main heraldic motifs of the Low Countries. The black lion on gold of Flanders (see Coat of arms of Flanders), its inverse the gold lion on black of Brabant, and the red lion on gold of Holland. 
There is one more lion of note, the red lion on blue and white bars of Luxembourg, as their ruling family sat on the imperial throne as Holy Roman Emperors:

The Flemish lion derives from the arms of the Counts of Flanders. Their first appearance is on a seal of Count Philip of Alsace, count of Flanders from 1168 to 1191, dating from 1163. As such they constitute the oldest of the many territorial arms bearing a lion in the Low Countries.  It is said that Philip of Alsace brought the lion flag with him from the Holy land, where in 1177 he supposedly conquered it from a Saracen knight, but this is a myth. However, Count Philip was not the first of his line to bear a lion, for his cousin, William of Ypres, already used a seal with a lion passant in 1158. The simple fact that the lion appeared on his personal seal since 1163, when he had not yet set one step in the Levant, disproves it.

In the same period lions also appeared in the arms of Brabant, Luxembourg, Holland, Limburg and other territories, most importantly England. It is curious that the lion as a heraldic symbol was mostly used in border territories and neighbouring countries of the Holy Roman Empire and France. It was in all likelihood a way of showing independence from the emperor, who used an eagle in his personal arms and the King of France, who used the famous Fleur-de-lis. In Europe the lion had been a well-known figure since Roman times, through works such as the fables of Aesop.  In the story about the Guldensporenslag, the arms and its corresponding battlecry Vlaendr'n den leeuw ("Flanders, the Lion!") plays a crucial role in the forming of a Flemish consciousness, which was popularised in recent times by the book De Leeuw van Vlaanderen by Hendrik Conscience. As a result, the arms of the county live on as arms of the Flemish Community.

The Arms of Brabant were first used probably by Count Lambert I of Louvain, the lion is also documented in a 1306 town's seal of Kerpen, together with the red lion of Limburg. Today these arms are used by the Kings of the Belgians.

These lions are repeated in many arms in the Netherlands, of various noble houses (see Armorial of the Seventeen Provinces of the Netherlands (fr)) and in the arms of other provinces:

When the county of Flanders was inherited by the Dukes of Burgundy in 1405, the Flemish lion was placed on an escutcheon in their dynastic arms (see Armorial of the French Royal House or Armorial of Dukes of Burgundy). The same happened with the duchy of Brabant (and its dependent duchy of Limburg) in 1430, but oddly not the county of Holland in 1432. These passed with the rest of the Burgundian inheritance to the House of Habsburg in 1482. Their descendants, the Kings of Spain bear the title of the county of Flanders (Holland was renounced in 1648 with the Treaty of Westphalia) and the duchy of Brabant to this day, and the arms was continually used until the abolition of the King Alfonso XIII in 1931 (see Coat of arms of the King of Spain and List of titles and honours of the Spanish Crown).

The lion, as representing the Burgundian Netherlands, first appears as a crest on the tomb of Philip the Handsome. Later Charles V added the sword. The arrows were used, on coins etc.,  since the early 16th century to represent the Seventeen Provinces in the low countries under control of Charles V.

In 1578, during the Eighty Years' War, the States General ordered a new great seal representing the lion, the sword and the 17 arrows combined. Although only seven provinces remained free from Spain, this seal stayed in use until 1795.

New States Lion

After the completion of its forming in 1584 the Republic of the Seven United Provinces used as its arms: Or a crowned lion Gules armed and langued Azure, holding in his dexter paw a sword and in the sinister paw seven arrows tight together Azure. The colours of this version where derived from the most important of the seven provinces, the county of Holland (its arms are still in use since being adopted by the counts of Holland c. 1198).

The tinctures were inverted in 1665 to a gold lion on red to be more representative of all the provinces of the union. 
When the provinces of Brabant, Gelderland, Flanders, Holland, Zeeland, Friesland, Mechelen and Utrecht on 26 July 1581 signed the Act of Abjuration declaring their independence from Spain and Philip II, these arms became the arms of the new nation.

The sovereignty of the federal union was emphasized by the title of the States General "their Noble Mightinesses, the Lords States-General of the United Provinces of the Netherlands" or, in Dutch, "Den Heeren Hoog-Mogenden, Den Heeren Staten-Generaal der Verenigde Provinciën der Nederlanden"). and by a crown on the lion in their arms.

The number of arrows changed over time. At first there were 17, despite the fact that the Union of Utrecht counted 11 districts after the Fall of Antwerp in 1585.  It was hoped by William the Silent that all the Seventeen Provinces of the Netherlands would eventually be united.  However, this was not to be, and so it was eventually changed to 11, and with the Reduction of Groningen to 7.  The number of arrows on the arms fixed at 7 in 1606, but the seal still remained with 17 arrows until 1795.

Duke of Anjou

At the time of the Dutch declaration of independence the territory under nominal States-General control was steadily shrinking. Parma made steady progress. Orange had already been convinced that the only way to avert total defeat was to regain support of the moderates, alienated by Calvinist radicalism; reassure the still-loyal Catholics in the South; and retain the trust of the German Lutheran princes and the king of France. To attain these objectives he now persuaded the States-General to offer sovereignty over the Netherlands to the younger brother of Henry III of France, François, Duke of Anjou, who in 1578 had already intervened on behalf of the States-General. The latter arrived in Antwerp in January 1581, where he took an oath to in effect govern as a "constitutional monarch", and was acclaimed by the States-General as Protector of the Netherlands.

Unfortunately, Orange's attempt to paper over the disunity within the States-General by bringing in Anjou did not succeed. Holland and Zeeland acknowledged him perfunctorily, but mainly ignored him, and of the other members of the Union of Utrecht Overijssel, Gelderland and Utrecht never even recognised him.

At the time of his sovereignty, Anjou replaced the Generality Lion by arms that he himself designed incorporating all the arms of the, at that time, nine Dutch rebellious provinces with France.
 
Anjou himself was dissatisfied with his limited power, and decided to take the Flemish cities of Antwerp, Bruges, Dunkirk, and Ostend by force.  He decided personally to lead the attack on Antwerp on 18 January 1583. In an attempt to fool the citizens of Antwerp, Anjou asked to be permitted to make a "Joyous Entry" into the city in order to honour them with a parade.  As soon as his troopers entered, the gates of Antwerp were slammed shut behind them and the citizen militia attacked them. Anjou barely escaped with his life and nearly his entire army perished, an affair known as the French Fury.

After that the States-General re-established the previous arms.

Batavian Republic
The Batavian Republic founded in 1795 used in its first year the arms of the Dutch Republic, i.e. the Dutch lion or lion with crown, sheaf of arrows and swords. But on May 4, 1796, the Dutch Lion badge was replaced by a free drawing of the Netherlands Maiden around an altar with an anchor, and the States Lion with her.

The substitution in 1801 of the Batavian Republic by the Batavian Commonwealth, whose main feature was a stronger Grand Pensionary acting the part locally of the First Counsul Bonaparte also had its impact on heraldry. On April 12, 1802, it was decided that the new badge of the Commonwealth would be a golden lion on a red field again. The number of arrows that bears the lion in the leg was not established.  This remained in use until the Kingdom of Holland was formed in 1806 for Napoleon's brother, installed as King Louis I of Holland.

Kingdom of Holland

Napoleon's brother Louis Bonaparte was installed as King of Holland on 5 June 1806. Originally the arms of the new kingdom were to be like those of the Kingdom of Italy: an eagle bearing a shield, with the arms of the United Netherlands, the lion, now royally crowned. In December 1806, A. Renodi in Paris designed arms quartering the Napoleonic eagle with the lion of the United Netherlands. Around the shield was the French Order of the Grand Aigle. Behind the shield are crossed sceptres, typical for Napoleonic heraldry, and above the shield, Napoleon's star.

A few months later, on 20 May 1807, King Louis (now called "Lodewijk") altered these arms, adding a helmet, leaving out his brother’s star and replacing the Grand Aigle with his own Dutch Order of the Union and the old Dutch devise Eendracht maakt macht ("Unity makes strength") around the shield. Exemplary for the innovation in Napoleon's heraldry are the two hands coming out of clouds from behind the shield holding swords, designating King Louis as Connétable de France.

Kingdom of the Netherlands

When William VI of Orange returned to the Netherlands in 1813 and was proclaimed Sovereign Prince of the Netherlands, he quartered the former Arms of the Dutch Republic (1st and 4th quarter) with the "Châlon-Orange" arms (2nd and 3rd quarter), which had come to symbolize Orange. As an in escutcheon he placed his ancestral arms of Nassau. (See House of Orange-Nassau) When he became King in 1815, he combined the Dutch Republic Lion with the billets of the Nassau arms and added a royal crown to form the Coat of arms of the Netherlands. In 1907, Queen Wilhelmina replaced the royal crown on the lion and the shield bearers of the arms with a coronet and had the phallus of the lion removed.

References

Sources

Gelderen, M. van (2002), The Political Thought of the Dutch Revolt 1555–1590, Cambridge University Press, 
Glete, J. (2002),War and the State in Early Modern Europe. Spain, the Dutch Republic and Sweden as Fiscal-Military States, 1500–1660, Routledge, 
Israel, Jonathan (1989), Dutch Primacy in World Trade, 1585–1740, Clarendon Press, 
Israel, Jonathan (1990), Empires and Entrepôts: The Dutch, the Spanish Monarchy, and the Jews, 1585–1713, Continuum International Publishing Group, 
Israel, Jonathan (1995), The Dutch Republic: Its Rise, Greatness, and Fall 1477–1806, Clarendon Press, Oxford, 
 Motley, John Lothrop (1855). The Rise of the Dutch Republic. Harper & Brothers. 
 Rowen, Herbert H. (1978). John de Witt, grand pensionary of Holland, 1625-1672. Princeton University Press.

External links 

 Heraldry of the World

Badges
Dutch coats of arms
Dutch monarchy
Dutch Republic
Dutch heraldry
Lions in heraldry
Dutch Republic
National symbols of the Netherlands